This is a list of events and openings related to amusement parks that occurred in 2010. These various lists are not exhaustive.

Amusement Parks

Opening 

 UAE Ferrari World Abu Dhabi - November 4
China Fantawild Adventure - May 1
 Singapore Universal Studios Singapore - March 18
Taiwan E-DA Theme Park

Birthday 

 Mt. Olympus Water & Theme Park - 20th Birthday
 Universal Studios Florida - 20th Birthday
 Alton Towers - 30th Birthday
 Busch Gardens Williamsburg - 35th Birthday
 Europa Park - 35th Birthday
 Walibi Belgium - 35th Birthday
 Silver Dollar City - 50th Birthday
 Disneyland - 55th Birthday
 Knott's Berry Farm - 70th Birthday
 Cedar Point - 140th Birthday
 Six Flags New England - 140th Birthday

Closed
 Buckskin Joe
 Fantasy Gardens
 Karolinelund
 Loudoun Castle
 Terra Encantada - June 19

Additions

Roller coasters

New

Relocated

Refurbished

Other Attractions

New

Refurbished

Relocated

Closed attractions and roller coasters

References 

Amusement parks by year
2010-related lists